Anders Johansson (born January 10, 1955) is a male former international table tennis player and coach for Sweden.

Table tennis career
He won a gold medal in the Swaythling Cup (men's team event) at the 1973 World Table Tennis Championships as part of the Sweden team that contained Ingemar Wikström, Kjell Johansson, Stellan Bengtsson and Bo Persson.

He also won two gold medals in the European Table Tennis Championships.

See also
 List of table tennis players
 List of World Table Tennis Championships medalists

References

Swedish male table tennis players
Swedish table tennis coaches
1955 births
Living people
World Table Tennis Championships medalists